The 2015 Colorado Rockies season was the franchise's 23rd in Major League Baseball. Walt Weiss returned for his third consecutive season as  manager. It was the 21st season the Rockies played their home games at Coors Field.

Offseason
November 24, 2014: Juan Nicasio was traded by the Colorado Rockies to the Los Angeles Dodgers. The Los Angeles Dodgers sent Noel Cuevas (minors) (December 16, 2014) to the Colorado Rockies to complete the trade.
December 11, 2014: Josh Rutledge was traded by the Colorado Rockies to the Los Angeles Angels of Anaheim for Jairo Diaz.
December 16, 2014: Daniel Descalso was signed as a free agent by the Colorado Rockies.
January 5, 2015: Nick Hundley was signed as a free agent by the Colorado Rockies.
January 30, 2015: David Hale was traded by the Atlanta Braves with Gus Schlosser to the Colorado Rockies for Jose Briceno (minors) and Chris O'Dowd (minors).
February 4, 2015: Kyle Kendrick was signed as a free agent by the Colorado Rockies.
March 22, 2015: Jhoulys Chacín was released by the Colorado Rockies.

Regular season
The Rockies played eight extra-inning games during the season, the fewest of any MLB team in 2015.

Season standings

National League West

National League Wild Card

Record vs. opponents

Transactions
July 28, 2015: Troy Tulowitzki was traded with LaTroy Hawkins to the Toronto Blue Jays for José Reyes, Miguel Castro, Jeff Hoffman, and Jesus Tinoco (minors).
August 20, 2015: Drew Stubbs was released by the Colorado Rockies.
August 27, 2015: Rafael Betancourt was released by the Colorado Rockies.

Major League Debuts
Batters
Dustin Garneau (Aug 20)
Tom Murphy (Sep 12)
Pitchers
Scott Oberg (Apr 14)
Ken Roberts (May 3)
Jon Gray (Aug 4)
Jason Gurka (Aug 29)

Roster

Game log 

|-  bgcolor="ffbbbb"
|- align="center" bgcolor="bbffbb"
| 1 || April 6 || @ Brewers || 10–0 || Kendrick (1–0) || Lohse (0–1) || || 46,032 || 1–0
|- align="center" bgcolor="bbffbb"
| 2 || April 7 || @ Brewers || 5–2 || Lyles (1–0) || Garza (0–1) || Hawkins (1) || 30,222 || 2–0
|- align="center" bgcolor="bbffbb"
| 3 || April 8 || @ Brewers || 5–4 (10) || Hawkins (1–0) || Rodríguez (0–1) || Axford (1) || 28,720 || 3–0
|- align="center" bgcolor="bbffbb"
| 4 || April 10 || Cubs || 5–1 || Bergman (1–0) || Wood (0–1) || || 49,303 || 4–0
|- align="center" bgcolor="ffbbbb"
| 5 || April 11 || Cubs || 9–5 || Hammel (1–0) || Kendrick (1–1) || || 43,812 || 4–1
|- align="center" bgcolor="ffbbbb"
| 6 || April 12 || Cubs || 6–5 || Ramirez (1–0) || Hawkins (1–1) || Rondón (2) || 41,363 || 4–2
|- align="center" bgcolor="bbffbb"
| 7 || April 13 || @ Giants || 2–0 || Butler (1–0) || Heston (1–1) || Betancourt (1) || 42,019 || 5–2
|- align="center" bgcolor="bbffbb"
| 8 || April 14 || @ Giants || 4–1 || Oberg (1–0) || Hudson (0–1) || Ottavino (1) || 41,051 || 6–2
|- align="center" bgcolor="bbffbb"
| 9 || April 15 || @ Giants || 4–2 || Matzek (1–0) || Lincecum (0–1) || Ottavino (2) || 41,188 || 7–2
|- align="center" bgcolor="ffbbbb"
| 10 || April 17 || @ Dodgers || 7–3 || Kershaw (1–1) || Kendrick (1–2) || || 48,950 || 7–3
|- align="center" bgcolor="ffbbbb"
| 11 || April 18 || @ Dodgers || 6–3 || Greinke (2–0) || Lyles (1–1) || Peralta (3) || 45,912 || 7–4
|- align="center" bgcolor="ffbbbb"
| 12 || April 19 || @ Dodgers || 7–0 || McCarthy (2–0) || Butler (1–1) || || 44,666 || 7–5
|- align="center" bgcolor="ffbbbb"
| 13 || April 20 || Padres || 14–3 || Despaigne (2–0) || de la Rosa (0–1) || || 22,586 || 7–6
|- align="center" bgcolor="ffbbbb"
| 14 || April 21 || Padres || 7–6 || Maurer (1–0) || Logan (0–1) || Kimbrel (5) || 22,600 || 7–7
|- align="center" bgcolor="bbffbb"
| 15 || April 22 || Padres || 5–4 || Ottavino (1–0) || Kelley (0–2) || || 22,705 || 8–7
|- align="center" bgcolor="bbffbb"
| 16 || April 23 || Padres || 2–1 || Lyles (2–1) || Ross (1–1) || Axford (2) || 31,672 || 9–7
|- align="center" bgcolor="bbffbb"
| 17 || April 24 || Giants || 6–4 || Butler (2–1) || Heston (2–2) || Ottavino (3) || 31,453 || 10–7
|- align="center" bgcolor="ffbbbb"
| 18 || April 25 || Giants || 5–4 (11) || Machi (1–0) || Brown (0–1) || || 36,474 || 10–8
|- align="center" bgcolor="bbbbbb"
| – || April 26 || Giants || colspan=6 | Postponed (rain) Rescheduled for May 23
|- align="center" bgcolor="bbffbb"
| 19 || April 27 || @ Diamondbacks || 5–4 || Matzek (2–0) || Anderson (0–1) || Axford (3) || 17,444 || 11–8
|- align="center" bgcolor="ffbbbb"
| 20 || April 28 || @ Diamondbacks || 12–5 || Chafin (1–0) || Kendrick (1–3) || || 18,792 || 11–9
|- align="center" bgcolor="ffbbbb"
| 21 || April 29 || @ Diamondbacks || 9–1 || Collmenter (2–3) || Lyles (2–2) || || 19,633 || 11–10
|-

|-  bgcolor="ffbbbb"
|- align="center" bgcolor="ffbbbb"
| 22 || May 1 || @ Padres || 14–3 || Kennedy (1–1) || Butler (2–2) || || 30,186 || 11–11
|- align="center" bgcolor="ffbbbb"
| 23 || May 2 || @ Padres || 4–2 || Morrow (2–0) || de la Rosa (0–2) || Kimbrel (7) || 28,058 || 11–12
|- align="center" bgcolor="ffbbbb"
| 24 || May 3 || @ Padres || 8–6 || Shields (3–0) || Kendrick (1–4) || Kimbrel (8) || 34,197 || 11–13
|- align="center" bgcolor="bbbbbb"
| – || May 4 || Diamondbacks || colspan=6 | Postponed (rain) Rescheduled for September 1
|- align="center" bgcolor="bbbbbb"
| – || May 5 || Diamondbacks || colspan=6 | Postponed (rain) Rescheduled for May 6
|- align="center" bgcolor="ffbbbb"
| 25 || May 6 || Diamondbacks || 13–7 || Collmenter (3–3) || Matzek (2–1) || || 22,621 || 11–14
|- align="center" bgcolor="ffbbbb"
| 26 || May 6 || Diamondbacks || 5–1 || Ray (1–0) || Lyles (2–3) || || 22,621 || 11–15
|- align="center" bgcolor="ffbbbb"
| 27 || May 8 || Dodgers || 2–1 (5) || Anderson (2–1) || Butler (2–3) || || 32,974 || 11–16
|- align="center" bgcolor="bbbbbb"
| – || May 9 || Dodgers || colspan=6 | Postponed (rain/snow) Rescheduled for June 2
|- align="center" bgcolor="ffbbbb"
| 28 || May 10 || Dodgers || 9–5 || Báez (1–0) || Oberg (1–1) || || 30,710 || 11–17
|- align="center" bgcolor="ffbbbb"
| 29 || May 12 || @ Angels || 5–2 || Wilson (2–2) || Betancourt (0–1) || Street (11) || 28,150 || 11–18
|- align="center" bgcolor="ffbbbb"
| 30 || May 13 || @ Angels || 2–1 (11) || Ramos (2–0) || Friedrich (0–1) || || 30,129 || 11–19
|- align="center" bgcolor="bbffbb"
| 31 || May 14 || @ Dodgers || 5–4 || Betancourt (1–1) || García (2–1) || Axford (4) || 42,650 || 12–19
|- align="center" bgcolor="ffbbbb"
| 32 || May 15 || @ Dodgers || 6–4 || Kershaw (2–2) || Butler (2–4) || Nicasio (1) || 46,662 || 12–20
|- align="center" bgcolor="bbffbb"
| 33 || May 16 || @ Dodgers || 7–1 || de la Rosa (1–2) || Greinke (5–1) || || 48,378 || 13–20
|- align="center" bgcolor= "ffbbbb"
| 34 || May 17 || @ Dodgers || 1–0 || Bolsinger (2–0) || Kendrick (1–5) || Jansen (1) ||  44,990 || 13–21
|- align="center" bgcolor="ffbbbb"
| 35 || May 18 || Phillies || 4–3 || Hamels (4–3) || Lyles (2–4) || Papelbon (10) || 24,061 || 13–22
|- align="center" bgcolor="bbffbb"
| 36 || May 19 || Phillies || 6–5 || Oberg (2–1) || De Fratus (0–1) || Axford (5) || 21,249 || 14–22
|- align="center" bgcolor="ffbbbb"
| 37 || May 20 || Phillies || 4–2 || González (2–1) || Butler (2–5) || Papelbon (11) || 21,714 || 14–23
|- align="center" bgcolor="bbffbb"
| 38 || May 21 || Phillies || 7–3 || Bergman (2–0) || Williams (3–4) || || 25,418 || 15–23
|- align="center" bgcolor="ffbbbb"
| 39 || May 22 || Giants || 11–8 || Vogelsong (3–2) || Kendrick (1–6) || Casilla (11) || 31,226 || 15–24
|- align="center" bgcolor="ffbbbb"
| 40 || May 23 || Giants || 10–8 || Heston (4–3) || Lyles (2–5) || Casilla (12) || 32,956 || 15–25
|- align="center" bgcolor="bbffbb"
| 41 || May 23 || Giants || 5–3 || Hale (1–0) || Petit (1–1) || Axford (6) || 30,180 || 16–25
|- align="center" bgcolor="bbffbb"
| 42 || May 24 || Giants || 11–2 || Bettis (1–0) || Hudson (2–4) || || 34,404 || 17–25
|- align="center" bgcolor="bbffbb"
| 43 || May 25 || @ Reds || 5–4 || Betancourt (2–1) || Chapman (2–3) || Axford (7) || 20,516 || 18–25
|- align="center" bgcolor="ffbbbb"
| 44 || May 26 || @ Reds || 2–1 || Chapman (3–3) || Brown (0–2) || || 22,523 || 18–26
|- align="center" bgcolor="bbffbb"
| 45 || May 27 || @ Reds || 6–4 || Kendrick (2–6) || Leake (2–4) || Axford (8) || 23,917 || 19–26
|- align="center" bgcolor="bbffbb"
| 46 || May 29 || @ Phillies || 4–1 || Bettis (2–0) || Hamels (5–4) || || 22,227 || 20–26
|- align="center" bgcolor="bbffbb"
| 47 || May 30 || @ Phillies || 5–2 || Butler (3–5) || Harang (4–5) || Axford (9) || 23,510 || 21–26
|- align="center" bgcolor="bbffbb"
| 48 || May 31 || @ Phillies || 4–1 || Rusin (1–0) || Williams (3–5) || Oberg (1) || 22,166 || 22–26
|-

|-  bgcolor="ffbbbb"
|- align="center" bgcolor="ffbbbb"
| 49 || June 1 || Dodgers || 11–4 || Kershaw (4–3) || Kendrick (2–7) || || 25,564 || 22–27
|- align="center" bgcolor="bbffbb"
| 50 || June 2 || Dodgers || 6–3 || de la Rosa (2–2) || Thomas (0–1) || Axford (10) || 28,148 || 23–27
|- align="center" bgcolor="ffbbbb"
| 51 || June 2 || Dodgers || 9–8 || Ravin (1–0) || Betancourt (2–2) || Jansen (5) || 24,972 || 23–28
|- align="center" bgcolor="bbffbb"
| 52 || June 3 || Dodgers || 7–6 || Axford (1–0) || García (2–2) || || 24,575 || 24–28
|- align="center" bgcolor="ffbbbb"
| 53 || June 5 || Marlins || 6–2 || Koehler (4–3) || Butler (3–6) || Ramos (6) || 32,091 || 24–29
|- align="center" bgcolor="bbffbb"
| 54 || June 6 || Marlins || 10–5 || Rusin (2–0) || Phelps (2–3) || || 30,373 || 25–29
|- align="center" bgcolor="ffbbbb"
| 55 || June 7 || Marlins || 3–2 (10) || Dyson (3–2) || Logan (0–2) || Ramos (7) || 35,139 || 25–30
|- align="center" bgcolor="bbffbb"
| 56 || June 8 || Cardinals || 11–3 || Hale (2–0) || Lackey (4–4) || || 32,043 || 26–30
|- align="center" bgcolor="bbffbb"
| 57 || June 9 || Cardinals || 4–3 || de la Rosa (3–2) || Wacha (8–2) || Axford (11) || 33,731 || 27–30
|- align="center" bgcolor="ffbbbb"
| 58 || June 10 || Cardinals || 4–2 || Martínez (7–2) || Bettis (2–1) || Rosenthal (20) || 30,698 || 27–31
|- align="center" bgcolor="ffbbbb"
| 59 || June 11 || @ Marlins || 6–0 || Phelps (3–3) || Rusin (2–1) || || 18,003 || 27–32
|- align="center" bgcolor="ffbbbb"
| 60 || June 12 || @ Marlins || 5–1 || Ureña (1–2) || Kendrick (2–8) || || 20,355 || 27–33
|- align="center" bgcolor="ffbbbb"
| 61 || June 13 || @ Marlins || 4–1 || Latos (2–4) || Hale (2–1) || Ramos (8) || 26,647 || 27–34
|- align="center" bgcolor="bbffbb"
| 62 || June 14 || @ Marlins || 4–1 || de la Rosa (4–2) || Haren (6–3) || Axford (12) || 20,879 || 28–34
|- align="center" bgcolor="ffbbbb"
| 63 || June 15 || @ Astros || 6–3 || Keuchel (8–2) || Bettis (2–2) || Gregerson (16) || 21,820 || 28–35
|- align="center" bgcolor="ffbbbb"
| 64 || June 16 || @ Astros || 8–5 || Harris (3–0) || Rusin (2–2) || Gregerson (17) || 22,245 || 28–36
|- align="center" bgcolor="ffbbbb"
| 65 || June 17 || Astros || 8–4 || Oberholtzer (2–1) || Kendrick (2–9) || || 33,041 || 28–37
|- align="center" bgcolor="ffbbbb"
| 66 || June 18 || Astros || 8–4 || McHugh (7–3) || Hale (2–2) || || 30,770 || 28–38
|- align="center" bgcolor="ffbbbb"
| 67 || June 19 || Brewers || 9–5 || Jungmann (2–1) || de la Rosa (4–3) || || 35,841 || 28–39
|- align="center" bgcolor="bbffbb"
| 68 || June 20 || Brewers || 5–1 || Bettis (3–2) || Lohse (3–9) || || 35,180 || 29–39
|- align="center" bgcolor="bbffbb"
| 69 || June 21 || Brewers || 10–4 || Rusin (3–2) || Garza (4–9) || || 41,487 || 30–39
|- align="center" bgcolor="bbffbb"
| 70 || June 23 || Diamondbacks || 10–5 || Kendrick (3–9) || Anderson (3–2) || || 30,079 || 31–39
|- align="center" bgcolor="ffbbbb"
| 71 || June 24 || Diamondbacks || 8–7 || Hudson (2–2) || Axford (1–1) || Ziegler (11) || 30,367 || 31–40
|- align="center" bgcolor="bbffbb"
| 72 || June 25 || Diamondbacks || 6–4 || Miller (1–0) || Hudson (2–3) || Axford (13) || 30,568 || 32–40
|- align="center" bgcolor="bbffbb"
| 73 || June 26 || @ Giants || 8–6 || Bettis (4–2) || Hudson (5–7) || || 41,887 || 33–40
|- align="center" bgcolor="ffbbbb"
| 74 || June 27 || @ Giants || 7–5 || Kontos (2–0) || Betancourt (2–3) || Casilla (20) || 41,746 || 33–41
|- align="center" bgcolor="ffbbbb"
| 75 || June 28 || @ Giants || 6–3 || Bumgarner (8–4) || Kendrick (3–10) || Casilla (21) || 41,795 || 33–42
|- align="center" bgcolor="ffbbbb"
| 76 || June 29 || @ Athletics || 7–1 || Graveman (5–4) || Hale (2–3) || || 12,125 || 33–43
|- align="center" bgcolor="bbffbb"
| 77 || June 30 || @ Athletics || 2–1 || de la Rosa (5–3) || Bassitt (0–1) || Hawkins (2) || 19,206 || 34–43
|-

|-  bgcolor="ffbbbb"
|- align="center" bgcolor="ffbbbb"
| 78 || July 1 || @ Athletics || 4–1 || Hahn (6–6) || Bettis (4–3) || Clippard (14) || 17,655 || 34–44
|- align="center" bgcolor="ffbbbb"
| 79 || July 2 || @ Diamondbacks || 8–1 || Hellickson (6–5) || Rusin (3–3) || || 16,861 || 34–45
|- align="center" bgcolor="ffbbbb"
| 80 || July 3 || @ Diamondbacks || 4–3 (10) || Chafin (5–0) || Flande (0–1) || || 22,449 || 34–46
|- align="center" bgcolor="ffbbbb"
| 81 || July 4 || @ Diamondbacks || 7–3 || Corbin (1–0) || Hale (2–4) || || 42,113 || 34–47
|- align="center" bgcolor="bbffbb"
| 82 || July 5 || @ Diamondbacks || 6–4 || de la Rosa (6–3) || De La Rosa (6–4) || Axford (14) || 22,996 || 35–47
|- align="center" bgcolor="ffbbbb"
| 83 || July 7 || Angels || 10–2 || Heaney (2–0) || Bettis (4–4) || || 26,232 || 35–48
|- align="center" bgcolor="ffbbbb"
| 84 || July 8 || Angels || 3–2 || Smith (3–2) || Axford (1–2) || Street (24) || 24,660 || 35–49
|- align="center" bgcolor="bbffbb"
| 85 || July 9 ||  Braves || 5–3 || Hale (3–4) || Brigham (0–1) || Axford (15) || 30,334 || 36–49
|- align="center" bgcolor="bbffbb"
| 86 || July 10 || Braves || 5–3 || Laffey (1–0) || Miller (5–5) || Axford (16) || 48,254 || 37–49
|- align="center" bgcolor="bbffbb"
| 87 || July 11 || Braves || 3–2 || Hawkins (2–1) || Grilli (3–4) || || 40,620 || 38–49
|- align="center" bgcolor="bbffbb"
| 88 || July 12 || Braves || 11–3 || Bettis (5–4) || Wood (6–6) || || 37,047 || 39–49
|- align="center" bgcolor="ffbbbb"
| 89 || July 17 || @ Padres || 4–2 || Shields (8–3) || de la Rosa (6–4) || Kimbrel (24) || 31,025 || 39–50
|- align="center" bgcolor="ffbbbb"
| 90 || July 18 || @ Padres || 5–4 || Maurer (6–2) || Friedrich (0–2) || Kimbrel (25) || 32,245 || 39–51
|- align="center" bgcolor="bbbbbb"
| – || July 19 || @ Padres || colspan=6 | Postponed (rain) Rescheduled for September 10
|- align="center" bgcolor="bbffbb"
| 91 || July 20 || Rangers || 8–7 || Axford (2–2) || Scheppers (3–1) || || 35,027 || 40–51
|- align="center" bgcolor="ffbbbb"
| 92 || July 21 || Rangers || 9–0 || Harrison (1–1) || Kendrick (3–11) || || 43,012 || 40–52
|- align="center" bgcolor="ffbbbb"
| 93 || July 22 || Rangers || 10–8 || Scheppers (4–1) || Axford (2–3) || Tolleson (15) || 33,348 || 40–53
|- align="center" bgcolor="bbffbb"
| 94 || July 24 || Reds || 6–5 || Axford (3–3) || Mattheus (1–2) || || 37,184 || 41–53
|- align="center" bgcolor="ffbbbb"
| 95 || July 25 || Reds || 5–2 || Cueto (7–6) || Rusin (3–4) || Chapman (20) || 41,998 || 41–54
|- align="center" bgcolor="bbffbb"
| 96 || July 26 || Reds || 17–7 || Kendrick (4–11) || Lorenzen (3–5) || || 46,828 || 42–54
|- align="center" bgcolor="ffbbbb"
| 97 || July 27 || @ Cubs || 9–8 || Soriano (1–0) || Axford (3–4) || || 35,070 || 42–55
|- align="center" bgcolor="bbffbb"
| 98 || July 28 || @ Cubs || 7–2 || Flande (1–1) || Beeler (1–1) || || 36,747 || 43–55
|- align="center" bgcolor="ffbbbb"
| 99 || July 29 || @ Cubs || 3–2 || Lester (6–8) || Butler (3–7) || Rondón (13) || 38,874 || 43–56
|- align="center" bgcolor="ffbbbb"
| 100 || July 30 || @ Cardinals || 9–8 || Villanueva (4–3) || Axford (3–5) || || 43,518 || 43–57
|- align="center" bgcolor="ffbbbb"
| 101 || July 31 || @ Cardinals || 7–0 || Wacha (12–4) || Kendrick (4–12) || || 42,568 || 43–58
|-

|-  bgcolor="ffbbbb"
|- align="center" bgcolor="bbffbb"
| 102 || August 1 || @ Cardinals || 6–2 || de la Rosa (7–4) || Lynn (8–6) || || 45,216 || 44–58
|- align="center" bgcolor="ffbbbb"
| 103 || August 2 || @ Cardinals || 3–2 || Rosenthal (2–2) || Oberg (2–2) || || 44,743 || 44–59
|- align="center" bgcolor="ffbbbb"
| 104 || August 3 || Mariners || 8–7 || Hernández (13–6)  || Butler (3–8) || Smith (10) || 33,107 || 44–60
|- align="center" bgcolor="ffbbbb"
| 105 || August 4 || Mariners || 10–4 || Rasmussen (1–0) || Friedrich (0–3) || || 34,376 || 44–61
|- align="center" bgcolor="bbffbb"
| 106 || August 5 || Mariners || 7–5 (11) || Flande (2–0) || Guaipe (0–3) || || 30,196 || 45–61
|- align="center" bgcolor="bbffbb"
| 107 || August 7 || @ Nationals || 5–4 || Oberg (3–2) || Storen (2–1) || Kahnle (1) || 33,622 || 46–61
|- align="center" bgcolor="ffbbbb"
| 108 || August 8 || @ Nationals || 6–1 || Strasburg (6–5) || Butler (3–9) || || 37,115 || 46–62
|- align="center" bgcolor="bbffbb"
| 109 || August 9 || @ Nationals || 6–4 || Axford (4–5) || Storen (2–2) || Kahnle (2) || 33,157 || 47–62
|- align="center" bgcolor="ffbbbb"
| 110 || August 10 || @ Mets || 4–2 || Niese (7–9) || Miller (1–1) || Familia (31) || 27,194 || 47–63
|- align="center" bgcolor="ffbbbb"
| 111 || August 11 || @ Mets || 4–0 || Harvey (11–7) || Rusin (3–5) || || 25,611 || 47–64
|- align="center" bgcolor="ffbbbb"
| 112 || August 12 || @ Mets || 3–0 || deGrom (11–6) || de la Rosa (7–5) || Familia (32) || 37,175 || 47–65
|- align="center" bgcolor="ffbbbb"
| 113 || August 13 || @ Mets || 12–3 || Syndergaard (7–6) || Butler (3–10) || || 36,573 || 47–66
|- align="center" bgcolor="ffbbbb"
| 114 || August 14 || Padres || 9–5 || Norris (3–9) || Roberts (0–1) || || 33,697 || 47–67
|- align="center" bgcolor="ffbbbb"
| 115 || August 15 || Padres || 7–5 || Quackenbush (2–2) || Kahnle (0–1) || Kimbrel (33) || 37,554 || 47–68
|- align="center" bgcolor="bbffbb"
| 116 || August 16 || Padres || 5–0 || Rusin (4–5) || Kennedy (7–11) || || 28,927 || 48–68
|- align="center" bgcolor="ffbbbb"
| 117 || August 18 || Nationals || 15–6 || Zimmermann (9–8) || Miller (1–2) || || 24,320 || 48–69
|- align="center" bgcolor="ffbbbb"
| 118 || August 19 || Nationals || 4–1 || Strasburg (7–6) || Betancourt (2–4) || Papelbon (20) ||  24,863 || 48–70
|- align="center" bgcolor="bbffbb"
| 119 || August 20 || Nationals || 3–2 || Flande (3–1) || Scherzer (11–10) || Axford (17) ||  25,211 || 49–70
|- align="center" bgcolor="ffbbbb"
| 120 || August 21 || Mets || 14–9 || Gilmartin (2–1) || Friedrich (0–4) || || 31,079 || 49–71
|- align="center" bgcolor="ffbbbb"
| 121 || August 22 || Mets || 14–9 || Niese (8–9) || Rusin (4–6) || || 46,170 || 49–72
|- align="center" bgcolor="ffbbbb"
| 122 || August 23 || Mets || 5–1 || Verrett (1–1) || Hale (3–5) || || 33,200 || 49–73
|- align="center" bgcolor="ffbbbb"
| 123 || August 24 || @ Braves || 5–3 || Teherán (9–6) || de la Rosa (7–6) || Vizcaíno (4) || 13,920 || 49–74
|- align="center" bgcolor="bbffbb"
| 124 || August 25 || @ Braves || 5–1 || Bettis (6–4) || Foltynewicz (4–6) || || 13,863 || 50–74
|- align="center" bgcolor="bbffbb"
| 125 || August 26 || @ Braves || 6–3 || S. Castro (1–0) || Miller (5–11) || Axford (18) || 18,328 || 51–74
|- align="center" bgcolor="ffbbbb"
| 126 || August 28 || @ Pirates || 5–3 || Watson (3–1) || Oberg (3–3) || Melancon (42) || 32,607 || 51–75
|- align="center" bgcolor="ffbbbb"
| 127 || August 29 || @ Pirates || 4–3 || Happ (7–7) || Rusin (4–7) || Melancon (43) || 35,838 || 51–76
|- align="center" bgcolor="bbffbb"
| 128 || August 30 || @ Pirates || 5–0 || de la Rosa (8–6) || Morton (8–6) || || 36,271 || 52–76
|- align="center" bgcolor="bbffbb"
| 129 || August 31 || Diamondbacks || 5–4 || S. Castro (2–0) || Ziegler (0–3) || || 21,386 || 53–76
|-

|-  bgcolor="ffbbbb"
|- align="center" bgcolor="ffbbbb"
| 130 || September 1 || Diamondbacks || 6–4 || Corbin (4–3) || M. Castro (0–3) || Hudson (3) || 21,550 || 53–77
|- align="center" bgcolor="ffbbbb"
| 131 || September 1 || Diamondbacks || 5–3 || De La Rosa (12–6) || Oberg (3–4) || Collmenter (1) || 20,411 || 53–78
|- align="center" bgcolor="bbffbb"
| 132 || September 2 || Diamondbacks || 9–4 || Brown (1–2) || Delgado (5–4) || Miller (1) || 20.574 || 54–78
|- align="center" bgcolor="bbffbb"
| 133 || September 3 || Giants || 11–3 || Rusin (5–7) || Vogelsong (9–11) || || 25,863 || 55–78
|- align="center" bgcolor="bbffbb"
| 134 || September 4 || Giants || 2–1 || de la Rosa (9–6) || Heston (11–9) || Axford (19) || 29,196 || 56–78
|- align="center" bgcolor="ffbbbb"
| 135 || September 5 || Giants || 7–3 || Peavy (5–6) || Bettis (6–5) || || 37,672 || 56–79
|- align="center" bgcolor="ffbbbb"
| 136 || September 6 || Giants || 7–4 || Bumgarner (17–7) || Flande (3–2) || Casilla (32) || 36,649 || 56–80
|- align="center" bgcolor="bbffbb"
| 137 || September 7 || @ Padres || 6–4 || Kendrick (5–12) || Kennedy (8–13) || Axford (20) || 24,585 || 57–80
|- align="center" bgcolor="ffbbbb"
| 138 || September 8 || @ Padres || 2–1 || Kimbrel (2–2) || Logan (0–3) || || 19,112 || 57–81
|- align="center" bgcolor="ffbbbb"
| 139 || September 9 || @ Padres || 11–4 || Shields (11–6) || Rusin (5–8) || || 22,764 || 57–82
|- align="center" bgcolor="bbffbb"
| 140 || September 10 || @ Padres || 4–3 || Miller (2–2) || Benoit (6–5) || Axford (21) || 21,922 || 58–82
|- align="center" bgcolor="bbffbb"
| 141 || September 11 || @ Mariners || 4–2 || Bettis (7–5) || Iwakuma (7–4) || Axford (22) || 19,876 || 59–82
|- align="center" bgcolor="ffbbbb"
| 142 || September 12 || @ Mariners || 7–2 || Elías (5–8) || Flande (3–3) || || 24,743 || 59–83
|- align="center" bgcolor="bbffbb"
| 143 || September 13 || @ Mariners || 3–2 || Kendrick (6–12) || Paxton (3–4) || Axford (23) || 21,840 || 60–83
|- align="center" bgcolor="ffbbbb"
| 144 || September 14 || @ Dodgers || 4–1 || Kershaw (14–6) || Gray (0–1) || Hatcher (3) || 43,731 || 60–84
|- align="center" bgcolor="bbffbb"
| 145 || September 15 || @ Dodgers || 5–4 (16) || Hale (4–5) || Latos (4–10) || Germen (1) || 45,311 || 61–84
|- align="center" bgcolor="ffbbbb"
| 146 || September 16 || @ Dodgers || 2–0 || Wood (11–10) || de la Rosa (9–7) || Jansen (32) || 45,906 || 61–85
|- align="center" bgcolor="bbffbb"
| 147 || September 18 || Padres || 7–4 || Bettis (8–5) || Kennedy (8–15) || Axford (24) || 27,303 || 62–85
|- align="center" bgcolor="bbffbb"
| 148 || September 19 || Padres || 10–2 || Bergman (3–0) || Erlin (0–1) || || 30,875 || 63–85
|- align="center" bgcolor="ffbbbb"
| 149 || September 20 || Padres || 10–4 || Shields (13–6) || Kendrick (6–13) || || 26,927 || 63–86
|- align="center" bgcolor="ffbbbb"
| 150 || September 21 || Pirates || 9–3 || Burnett (9–5) || Gray (0–2) || || 23,187 || 63–87
|- align="center" bgcolor="ffbbbb"
| 151 || September 22 || Pirates || 6–3 || Happ (10–8) || Rusin (5–9) || Melancon (49) || 23,433 || 63–88
|- align="center" bgcolor="ffbbbb"
| 152 || September 23 || Pirates || 13–7 || Blanton (6–2) || Bergman (3–1) || || 23,526 || 63–89
|- align="center" bgcolor="ffbbbb"
| 153 || September 24 || Pirates || 5–4 || Blanton (7–2) || Díaz (0–1) || Melancon (50) || 25,164 || 63–90
|- align="center" bgcolor="bbffbb"
| 154 || September 25 || Dodgers || 7–4 || Hale (5–5) || Bolsinger (6–5) || Axford (25) || 38,485 || 64–90
|- align="center" bgcolor="bbffbb"
| 155 || September 26 || Dodgers || 8–6 || Miller (3–2) || García (3–4) || || 40,322 || 65–90
|- align="center" bgcolor="bbffbb"
| 156 || September 27 || Dodgers || 12–5 || Rusin (6–9) || Wood (11–12) || || 32,870 || 66–90
|- align="center" bgcolor="ffbbbb"
| 157 || September 29 || @ Diamondbacks || 4–3 (11) || Delgado (7–4) || Brown (1–3) || || 21,526 || 66–91
|- align="center" bgcolor="ffbbbb"
| 158 || September 30 || @ Diamondbacks || 3–1 || Delgado (8–4) || Bettis (8–6) || Hudson (4) || 18,529 || 66–92
|-

|-  bgcolor="ffbbbb"
|- align="center" bgcolor="ffbbbb"
| 159 || October 1 || @ Diamondbacks || 8–6 || Burgos (2–2) || Miller (3–3) || Bracho (1) || 20,826 || 66–93
|- align="center" bgcolor="bbffbb"
| 160 || October 2 || @ Giants || 9–3 || Kendrick (7–13) || Heston (12–11) || || 41,505 || 67–93
|- align="center" bgcolor="ffbbbb"
| 161 || October 3 || @ Giants || 3–2 || Peavy (8–6) || Rusin (6–10) || Casilla (38) || 41,398 || 67–94
|- align="center" bgcolor="bbffbb"
| 162 || October 4 || @ Giants || 7–3 || Brothers (1–0) || Kontos (4–4) || || 41,399 || 68–94
|-

Player stats

Batting

Starters by position 
Note: Pos = Position; G = Games played; AB = At bats; H = Hits; Avg. = Batting average; HR = Home runs; RBI = Runs batted in

Other batters 
Note: G = Games played; AB = At bats; H = Hits; Avg. = Batting average; HR = Home runs; RBI = Runs batted in

Pitching

Starting pitchers 
Note: G = Games pitched; IP = Innings pitched; W = Wins; L = Losses; ERA = Earned run average; SO = Strikeouts

Note: There is no ERA leader (qualifier) for team because no pitcher pitched 1 inning per scheduled game (162 innings).

Other pitchers 
Note: G = Games pitched; IP = Innings pitched; W = Wins; L = Losses; ERA = Earned run average; SO = Strikeouts

Relief pitchers 
Note: G = Games pitched; W = Wins; L = Losses; SV = Saves; ERA = Earned run average; SO = Strikeouts

Awards and accomplishments
 MLB Franchise Four selections for Colorado Rockies:
 Andrés Galarraga (1B)
 Todd Helton (1B)
 Troy Tulowitzki (SS)
 Larry Walker (RF)

Farm system

References

External links
 2015 Colorado Rockies season Official Site 
 2015 Colorado Rockies season at Baseball Reference

Colorado Rockies seasons
Colorado Rockies
Colorado Rockies
2010s in Denver